The John & Annie Glenn Museum is a museum in New Concord, Ohio, United States, honoring astronaut and senator John Glenn and his wife Annie Glenn. It is located at the site of Glenn's boyhood home, which has been moved back to Main Street in New Concord, Ohio and restored as it was when he lived there until his enlistment in World War II.

History and mission
The mission of the museum is to honor the first American to orbit the Earth and his partnership with a remarkable woman. They also teach about life during the Great Depression and the Home Front during WWII through a living history presentation. The museum on May 19, 2019, was listed on the National Register of Historic Places.

References

External links
 John & Annie Glenn Museum web page

John Glenn
Biographical museums in Ohio
Aerospace museums in Ohio
Museums in Muskingum County, Ohio